Santiria laevigata is a species of plant in the Burseraceae family. It is found in Indonesia, Malaysia, the Philippines, and Singapore.

References

laevigata
Least concern plants
Taxonomy articles created by Polbot